Caldie is a chromium-molybdenum-vanadium alloyed tool steel manufactured by Uddeholms AB.  It is intended for cold work processes, such as blanking and piercing, applied to difficult materials such as advanced high strength steel, where compressive strength and chipping and cracking resistance are important.

Composition
The steel's composition is

Properties
Uddeholm Caldie is characterized by:
Very good chipping and cracking resistance
Good wear resistance
High hardness (>60 HRC) after high temperature tempering
Good dimensional stability in heat treatment and in service
Excellent through-hardening properties
Good machinability and grindability
Excellent polishability
Good surface treatment properties
Good resistance to tempering back
Very good WEDM properties

Application areas
Uddeholm Caldie is suitable for short to medium run tooling where chipping and/or cracking are the predominant failure mechanisms and where a high compressive strength (hardness of over 60 HRC) is necessary. This makes Uddeholm Caldie very suitable for severe cold work applications where the combination of a hardness above 60 HRC and a high cracking resistance is of utmost importance e.g. as in the blanking and forming of ultra high strength steel sheets. Uddeholm Caldie is also very suitable as a substrate steel for applications where surface coatings are desirable or necessary.

Blanking applications where high ductility and toughness are needed to prevent chipping/cracking
Cold forging and forming operations where a high compressive strength combined with good resistance to chipping/cracking are necessary
Machine knives
Thread rolling dies
Substrate for surface coatings

This steel can be used in engineering applications where high compressive strength has to be combined with high ductility/toughness. Knives for fragmentation of plastics and metals and roll forming rolls are good examples

See also
 Other Uddeholm Cold Work Steels:
 Arne,  
 Calmax, 
 Rigor, 
 Sleipner, 
 Sverker 3, 
 Sverker 21, 
 Unimax, 
 Vanadis 4 Extra, 
 Vanadis 6, 
 Vanadis 10, 
 Vanadis 23, 
 Vancron 40, 
 UHB 11, 
 Formax, 
 Holdax,

References

Steels